= Maryland Governor's Office of Crime Prevention and Policy =

The Maryland Governor’s Office of Crime Prevention & Policy (GOCPP) is the designated State Administering Agency (SAA) for the state of Maryland. Its main goal is to address public concerns related to crime and public health in the state of Maryland. The office was officially formed because of the merging of the Office of Justice Administration and the Governor's Drug and Alcohol Abuse Commission.

The stated purpose of the GOCPP is to reduce crime and drug abuse, protect public safety, and administer justice across the state. Specifically, the GOCPP is responsible for criminal justice planning and policy making within the state of Maryland. It is an executive branch agency of the Maryland government, which gives it the power to distribute criminal justice funds and leverage state and local grants to address crime & safety in all statewide justice systems.

== Background & History ==
=== Name Changes ===
The current office was preceded by several different iterations under different names, despite the office remaining consistent in its responsibilities throughout. In 1967, the office was first proposed as the Commission on Crime & Delinquency. The office was then renamed to the Governor’s Commission on Law Enforcement & the Administration of Justice later that same year. The name persisted until 1982 when the office was renamed again to the Maryland Criminal Justice Coordinating Council. In 1987, the office was renamed again to the Governor’s Office of Justice Assistance. The office was renamed for the final time in 1992 when it became known as the Office of Justice Administration. In 1989, the Governor’s Drug and Alcohol Abuse Commission was established.

=== History ===
Through several executive orders, the office further evolved in name, scope, and responsibilities.

In 2005, Executive Order 01.01.2005.36 was passed to empower the GOCPP to develop better approaches to crime through more effective management of the state’s resources.

In 2007, Executive Order 01.01.2007.04 was passed to place Maryland’s Statistical Analysis Center within the GOCPP to facilitate crime data analysis throughout the state and generation of effective local policies and solutions.

In 2020, Executive Order 01.01.2020.01 was passed to include the functions of the Governor’s Office for Children and rename the GOCPP to the Governor’s Office of Crime Prevention, Youth, and Victim Services.

In 2024, Executive Order 01.01.2024.05 was passed to reorganize the office as the Governor’s Office of Crime Prevention & Policy (again) and re-established the Governor’s Office for Children as its own entity.

Originally headquartered in Towson, MD, the office relocated to Crownsville, MD in June 2016.

== Duties & Structure ==
=== Duties ===
The Executive Director of the GOCPP is appointed by the sitting Governor of Maryland and serves as the chair of the Maryland Violence Intervention & Prevention Advisory Council. Overall, the main purpose of the office is to advise the sitting Governor on criminal justice strategies. Additionally, the office collaborates with private organizations, non-profit community groups, and other government entities to enhance public safety, reduce crime and juvenile delinquency, and support victims of such crimes. The office also acts as a liaison between private/nonprofit organizations and federal/state grants related to public safety. The stated vision of the office is “building a safer and more equitable Maryland that leaves no one behind”.

=== Structure ===
Prior to October 2016, the office was organized under 3 units: Special Projects, Policy, and Legislation.

The office is assisted by 4 other councils: The Cease Fire Council, the Maryland Violence and Prevention Advisory Council, the Justice Reinvestment Oversight Board, and the Governor’s Family Violence Council. These councils support the GOCPP in its daily functions but also serve their own purpose too.

The office also includes several units (and sub-units):

- Centers of Excellence
- Victims Service Unit
- Criminal Injuries Compensation Board
- Financial Operations
  - Maryland Domestic-Violence Healthcare Screening & Response Initiative
- Division of Children & Youth
- Policy
  - State Coordinating Council for Children
  - Incarceration
  - Local Management Boards (for each county in Maryland)
  - Second-Generation Strategies, Youth Homelessness & Racial Equity
  - Youth Engagement & Homelessness
- Programs & Implementation Division
  - Anti-Human Trafficking Policy
  - Planning & Implementation
  - Enforcing Underage Drinking Laws (EUDL) Program
  - Juvenile Justice & Victim Services
  - Law Enforcement Programs
  - Victims of Crime Assistance Initiatives
  - Violence Against Women Act Program
- Programs
  - Domestic Violence Unit Pilot Program
- Research, Analysis & Evaluation Program
  - Maryland Statistical Analysis Center

== Achievements & Policies ==
The GOCPP has assisted the current Moore-Miller Administration on policies related to public health and safety. One example of this is the Safe Streets initiative, which is an evidence-based public health program that was started in 2007 to reduce gun violence in Baltimore City. In the 2025 fiscal year, the GOCPP awarded nearly $12 million to programs and services that support justice-involved people. These programs include behavioral, health, medical, housing, and job support.
